The 2022 Western Michigan Broncos football team represented Western Michigan University in the 2022 NCAA Division I FBS football season. The Broncos played their home games at Waldo Stadium in Kalamazoo, Michigan, and competed in the West Division of the Mid-American Conference (MAC). The team was led by sixth-year head coach Tim Lester.  The Broncos finished the season 5–7 and 4–4 in MAC play.  After the season, Lester was fired.

Previous season

The Broncos finished the 2021 season 8–5 and 4–4 in the MAC to finish in a tie for fourth place in the West Division. They won the Quick Lane Bowl 52–24 over Nevada

Schedule

References

Western Michigan
Western Michigan Broncos football seasons
Western Michigan Broncos football